Edward Howard "Eddie" Lucas (born July 14, 1975) is an American retired professional basketball player and current production manager for Highland Construction in Fayetteville NC

Lucas was taken with the last pick of the 1999 NBA draft by the Utah Jazz. He was not offered a spot on the team, and spent three seasons playing for professional teams in Argentina, France, Russia, Israel, and Poland.

Early life and college
In his senior year at Redlands High School in Redlands, California, he was named the team's Most Valuable Player and averaged 20.2 points and was named to the 1A All State team. Lucas started his college career at the United States Naval Academy where he earned All League Patriot Honors in his sophomore year. After transferring to Virginia Tech, Lucas lead the Hokies in scoring at 15.1 points per game in his senior season. At Virginia Tech, Lucas majored in civil engineering.

Basketball career
In the 1999 NBA Draft, Lucas was the 58th and final overall pick, selected by the Utah Jazz. However, Lucas never played in the NBA. In addition, the United States Basketball League team Pennsylvania ValleyDawgs drafted Lucas in the fifth round of the 1999 USBL Draft.  The Sioux Falls Skyforce cut Lucas before the 1999–2000 Continental Basketball Association season.

In January 2000, Lucas signed with the Argentine team Libertad de Sunchales and signed with the French team Hermine de Nantes Atlantique the following month. With Nantes, Lucas averaged 18.7 points and 3.9 rebounds per game on 51% shooting. Later in 2000, Lucas joined Russian team BC Spartak Saint Petersburg, then the Israeli Bnei Herzliya (later Bnei HaSharon) in January 2001 and would leave the team in 2002.

Post-basketball career
After retiring from basketball, Lucas and former American football player Chris James founded Interactive Drills, an athletic training company. Lucas also earned a master's degree in Civil and Environmental Engineering with a specialty in Construction Management from Virginia Tech. Since 2011, Lucas has lived in Fayetteville, North Carolina.

References

External links

1975 births
Living people
American construction businesspeople
American exercise instructors
American expatriate basketball people in Argentina
American expatriate basketball people in France
American expatriate basketball people in Israel
American expatriate basketball people in Poland
American expatriate basketball people in Russia
American men's basketball players
Basketball players from California
Basketball players from Connecticut
BC Spartak Saint Petersburg players
Bnei HaSharon players
Guards (basketball)
Libertad de Sunchales basketball players
Navy Midshipmen men's basketball players
People from Groton, Connecticut
People from Redlands, California
Sportspeople from Fayetteville, North Carolina
Sportspeople from San Bernardino County, California
Unia Tarnów basketball players
Utah Jazz draft picks
Virginia Tech Hokies men's basketball players
Military personnel from California